Voltaic may refer to:

 Alessandro Volta (1745–1827), Italian physicist, chemist, and electricity pioneer
 Voltaic pile, the first electrical battery
 Electricity from an electrochemical cell or battery
 Voltaïc, releases from Björk's album, Volta
 Volta River, a river in west Africa
 Upper Volta, a colony and nation now known as Burkina Faso
 Gur languages, a subfamily of Atlantic-Congo languages formerly known as the Voltaic languages

See also
 
 Volta (disambiguation)
 List of forms of electricity named after scientists